SS Orontes was a passenger ship owned by Orient Line.

The ship was built in 1929 by Vickers Armstrong at Barrow-in-Furness, England.

Its sister ships were Orama (II), Orford, Oronsay, and Otranto (II). Orontes was the last of the "Orama" Class and great effort was taken to make the public rooms of Orontes the best of this class. The name had previously belonged to the RMS Orontes, an earlier ship owned by the Orient Line.

Service 
Orontes maiden voyage was a Mediterranean Cruise in June 1929. From 1929 to 1940, it served on the England to Australia route. It carried the England cricket team on the way to the Bodyline tour in 1932.

During World War II, Orontes became a troopship, serving that role from 1940 to 1947. In 1947 Orontes transported World War II prisoners of war from Melbourne to Cuxhaven, West Germany.

The ship served on the England to Australia route from 1948 to 1962, being refitted as a single class passenger ship at Thornycroft in 1953. In August 1958, Orontes was involved in a collision with SS Empire Baltic, a landing ship used as a ferry on the River Thames. The Orontes was scrapped at Valencia, Spain, in 1962.

References

Further reading
  - article about the post-war refit
 

1929 ships
Ships built in Barrow-in-Furness
Passenger ships of the United Kingdom
Troop ships of the United Kingdom
Ships of the Orient Line
Maritime history of Australia